Homolobus is a genus of insects belonging to the family Braconidae.

The genus has almost cosmopolitan distribution.

Species:
 Homolobus acares van Achterberg, 1979 
 Homolobus albipalpis (Granger, 1949)

References

Braconidae
Braconidae genera